Jody Anschutz (born October 18, 1962) is an American professional golfer. She competed as Jody Rosenthal prior to marrying Fred Anschutz on October 14, 1989.

Career
Rosenthal was born in Minneapolis, Minnesota. She attended the University of Tulsa. As an amateur she won the 1984 British Ladies Amateur and played for the United States in the 1984 Curtis Cup. Her debut season on the LPGA Tour was 1986 and she won Rookie of the Year honors. In her second season she won two tournaments including the du Maurier Classic, which was then one of the LPGA's major championships, and finished in the top ten in the other three majors on her way to fifth in the money list. From that time on however her career followed a downwards trajectory. She did not win again and did not make the top one hundred on the money list after 1992. She last played on the LPGA Tour in 2002.

Professional wins

LPGA Tour wins (2)

LPGA Tour playoff record (0–1)

LPGA of Japan Tour wins (1)
1986 Daio Paper Elleair Ladies Open

Major championships

Wins (1)

U.S. national team appearances
Amateur
Curtis Cup: 1984 (winners)
Espirito Santo Trophy: 1984 (winners)

External links

American female golfers
Tulsa Golden Hurricane women's golfers
LPGA Tour golfers
Winners of LPGA major golf championships
Winners of ladies' major amateur golf championships
Golfers from Minneapolis
1962 births
Living people